is a Western-style confectionery and cake company headquartered in Kobe, Japan.  Founded in 1977, the company has since expanded and now owns restaurants at thirty-one locations in Japan, mostly in the Kansai region.

The company name "Konigs-Krone" originates in "" that means "King's crown" in German language.

References

External links
 Konigs-Krone official website

Food and drink companies of Japan
Companies based in Kobe
Japanese companies established in 1977
Japanese brands
Food and drink companies established in 1977
Confectionery companies of Japan